Cain Township is one of eleven townships in Fountain County, Indiana. As of the 2010 census, its population was 1,142 and it contained 488 housing units.

History
Cain Township was one of the first townships to be established in the county; it was established on July 24, 1826.  At that time, much of the land was forested, but 100 years later most of the land was used for agriculture.  There were also several grain and lumber mills along Coal Creek, but these also were gone by the early 20th century.  The town of Hillsboro was laid out in the 1830s and still exists; the town of Rynear was established in the far northwest corner of the township, but was gone by the early 1900s.  The township's population was 1,763 in 1880, 1,537 in 1900, and 1,403 in 1910.

Geography
There is a single settlement in the township: the town of Hillsboro, which has a population of about 500 (about half the township's total population). This lies at the intersection of the east–west U.S. Route 136 and the north–south Indiana State Road 341, in the northern part of the township. Indiana State Road 32 runs along a portion of the southern border of the township.

Cemeteries
The township contains three cemeteries.  Rose Hill to the north and Spring Hill lie to the south of Hillsboro, while Scotts Prairie is in the far southwest corner of the township.

References

 
 United States Census Bureau 2010 TIGER/Line Shapefiles
 IndianaMap

Bibliography

External links
 Indiana Township Association
 United Township Association of Indiana

Townships in Fountain County, Indiana
Townships in Indiana